Rhynie is a village in Aberdeenshire, Scotland.

The Rhynie Chert is named after the village as well as the fossil plant genus Rhynia. The Rhynie Chert is a sediment deposited in the Devonian period, a specimen of which contained the oldest fossil insect in the world (Rhyniognatha hirsti).

The missionary, teacher and chocolatier Alexander Murdoch Mackay was born in Rhynie on 13 October 1849.

Etymology 
The name Rhynie may involve an early Pictish rīg meaning "a king" (c.f. Gaelic ríg/rí; c.f. Welsh rhi).

History

The "Rhynie Man" now stands inside Woodhill House (the headquarters of Aberdeenshire Council) in Aberdeen.

In 2011 archaeological excavations at Rhynie, near the site of the "Rhynie Man", by archaeologists from Aberdeen University and Chester University uncovered a substantial fortified settlement dating to the early medieval period.  Among the finds at the site were fragments of a late 5th- or 6th-century Roman amphora that must have been imported from the Mediterranean region.  This is significant as it is the only known example of a Roman amphora from Eastern Britain dating to the post-Roman period, and indicates that the inhabitants of the settlement must have been of high status.

Archaeologists working at the excavation have speculated that the settlement may have been a royal site occupied by Pictish kings. It has been suggested that Rhynie may have been a centre for royal assemblies between the sixth and eighth centuries.

Transport 
The village is served once a day on weekdays by the 231 service between Alford and Huntly. It was previously served by the 416 to Inverurie, but this route was withdrawn in 2021.

Notable people

Alexander Murdoch Mackay (1849-1890) "Mackay of Uganda"

Trivia
A bothy ballad alludes to Rhynie thus: "at Rhynie I shure my first hairst."
The Station Hotel at Rhynie is mentioned in the sketch "The Will" by Scotland the What, the joke being that there is no railway station at Rhynie, "...but they were aye hopin' for one."

References

Sources
Rhynie in the Gazetteer for Scotland.

Villages in Aberdeenshire
Geological type localities of Scotland